Antaeotricha mendax is a moth in the family Depressariidae. It was described by Philipp Christoph Zeller in 1855. It is found in Brazil (Minas Gerais), Panama and Peru.

The wingspan is about 19 mm. The forewings are ochreous-white with the dorsal two-fifths suffused light fuscous and with an elongate dark fuscous dorsal blotch from the base to the middle, the ends rounded and darker. The plical stigma forms an irregular dark fuscous dot above this and there is a somewhat inwards-oblique subtriangular dark fuscous blotch from the dorsum towards the termen, its apex forming a slight projection which touches the dark fuscous second discal stigma. There is an erect slightly curved series of four indistinct fuscous dots from the tornus and a marginal series of seven black dots around the apex and termen. The hindwings are pale whitish-yellowish.

References

Moths described in 1855
mendax
Moths of South America